The Liga Nacional Superior de Voleibol (Spanish for Senior National Volleyball League) is the top level Peruvian volleyball competition and it is organized by the Peruvian Volleyball Confederation. There are both men's and women's competitions. The number of participating clubs has been 12 per division since the 2011–12 season. The team champions qualify for the men's and women's South American Volleyball Club Championship.

History
Although Peru had volleyball competitions prior to 2004, in that year the Federación Peruana de Voleibol, Peru's Volleyball Confederation, organized the first tournament. The original format was heavily criticized due to poor organization from the sponsors and the teams. However, after Telefónica (now Movistar) decided to sponsor the Liga Nacional and change the format to include more teams and make the tournament more competitive, it grew, even becoming the qualifying tournament for Peruvian volleyball clubs to the South American Volleyball Club Championship.

Format
The original format that was used from 2004 to 2007–08 had 12 teams in two pools of 6, each team played once against the other 5 teams in the pool, after the first round matches were played, the 3 top teams from each pool formed a new final pool where the winner was declared champion while the bottom 3 teams from each pool played against each other as the bottom 2 teams from that round lost the category.

After Telefónica Peru joined the organizing comite, the format changed to include teams from clubs from all states in Peru and not just Lima. The competition had two parts, the Apertura and Clausura.

The Apertura was played first, consisted of a Round-Robyn system between 14 to 16 teams, after all matches are played the top 8 teams will move on while the bottom 6 or 8 teams are eliminated, the bottom 2 teams are at risk of losing the category. The top 8 teams will play the quarterfinals as follows: 1° VS 8°, 2° VS 7°, 3° VS 6° and 4° VS 5°. The winners will play the semifinals with the winning team from the 1° VS 8° match against the winner from the 4° VS 5° match, and the other two winning teams will play the other semifinal. The winners from the semifinals play for the first place while the losers play for the third place.

The Clausura was played a few months later, the top 8 teams will compete again in a Round-Robyn system, the top 4 teams will advance to the second round, in case the winning team from the Apertura finishes in 5th to 8th place, they will still advance to the second round with the top 3 teams. The 4 remaining teams will play against each other again, after each team has played the other 3, the ranking determines the semifinals, 1° VS 4° and 2° VS 3° with the winners from each match competing for the gold medal and the title of Champions of the Season while the losing teams play for the bronze medal.

As of the 2011–12 season, the competition uses the Regular Season formula which is 12 teams play two Round-Robyn tournaments, "Home and Away", the top eight teams after both rounds play the quarterfinals as follows: 1° VS 8°, 2° VS 7°, 3° VS 6° and 4° VS 5°. The winners will play the semifinals with the winning team from the 1° VS 8° match against the winner from the 4° VS 5° match, and the other two winning teams will play the other semifinal. The winners from the semifinals play for the first place while the losers play for the third place.

The winning team from the season qualifies for the South American Volleyball Club Championship.

Women's Competition

División Superior de Vóley (DISUNVOL)
Prior to the Liga Nacional Superior de Voleibol, the Peruvian Volleyball Federation had an inter-club competition known as the "Disunvol". The Disunvol was dissolved in 2002 following the FIVB's decision to disenroll Peru from all competitions.

The following is a list of champions in the DISUNVOL era:

Liga Nacional Superior de Voleibol

Copa Nacional de Voley

Titles by club

Men's Competition

Liga Nacional Superior de Voleibol

Titles by club

See also
Peru women's national volleyball team
Peru men's national volleyball team
Volleyball Copa Latina

References

External links
 Liga Nacional Superior de Voleibol official website
  Peruvian League. women.volleybox.net 

Peru
Volleyball in Peru
Sports leagues established in 2004